The World War II Memorial is installed in City Square Park, in Charlestown, Boston, Massachusetts, United States.

The memorial was dedicated in 1946 and rededicated in 1996.

See also
 1946 in art

References

External links
 

1946 establishments in Massachusetts
1946 sculptures
Charlestown, Boston
Monuments and memorials in Boston
Outdoor sculptures in Boston
World War II memorials in the United States